"Barrier Device" is a 2002 short film written and directed by Grace Lee.  It stars Sandra Oh as a sex researcher and Suzy Nakamura as a subject.  It won four awards, including the silver medal at the  29th Student Academy Awards.

Plot 
Researcher Audrey conducts a study on female condoms.  In the course of her work, she discovers that Serena, one of her subjects, is romantically involved with her ex-fiancé. Torn between professional integrity and curiosity, Audrey attempts to learn more about Serena's life without compromising her work.

Cast 
 Sandra Oh as Audrey
 Suzy Nakamura as Serena
 Melinda Peterson as Dr. Campbell
 Jonathan Liebhold as Dwight
 Brian Kim as Brian

Production 
Barrier Device was Grace Lee's master's thesis at UCLA.  Lee directly asked Oh to appear in her film.

Release 
Barrier Device premiered at the 2002 CAAMFest.

Reception

Awards

References

Further reading

External links 
 

2002 films
2002 short films
2002 drama films
American drama short films
Films directed by Grace Lee
American student films
2000s English-language films
2000s American films